Zdzisław Piernik (born 10 November 1937) in Toruń is a Polish virtuoso tuba player.


Biography
After being awarded at the 1970 National Festival of Young Musicians in Gdańsk he began his career as a soloist. Shortly afterwards he acquire success at recitals in the country and abroad, at festivals and holiday courses in Bayreuth, Witten, Darmstadt, Bourges, Stockholm, Los Angeles.

He was the first tubist in Poland to implement flageolets, glissandos, frullatos and chords into his playing. He also began sonoristic experiments with prepared tuba. He is the inventor of the original preparation, remodelling the instrument to sound far from its natural tone.

He worked closely with many composers demonstrating them the capabilities of the tuba, natural and prepared. As a soloist Zdzisław Piernik has taken part in hundreds of symphonic and chamber concerts, with extremely varied repertoire, starting from classical with his own transcriptions, ending with the newest acquisitions of contemporary music and his own compositions. His concerts, recordings and broadcasts for Polish Radio and television popularized playing on the tuba.

Zdzisław Piernik is designated as Lifetime Achievement Honorees of International Tuba Euphonium Association.

He is still active, playing concerts and giving lectures.

More important works
 Classical Repertoire
 Luigi Boccherini: Minuet
 Franz Schubert: Serenade
 Robert Schumann: Traumerai
 Anton Dvorak: Humoreske
 Henry Eccles: Sonata in G minor
 Ignacy Jan Paderewski: Minuet
 Modest Musorgski: Cattle ("Pictures at an Exhibition")
 Wolfgang Amadeus Mozart: Rondo in E flat major KV 371
 Camille Saint-Saëns: Morceau de Concert Op. 94 III. Allegro non-troppo
 Camille Saint-Saëns: Elephant, Swan ("Carnival of the Animals")

 Contemporary Repertoire
 Andrzej Dobrowolski: Music For Solo Tuba (1972)
 Elzbieta Sikora: Il Viaggio 1 (1975)
 Witold Szalonek: Piernikiana Per Tuba Sola (1977)
 : Vox Per Uno Strumento Ad Ottone (1977)
 Andrzej Krzanowski: Sonata For Solo Tuba (1978)
 Krzysztof Penderecki: Capriccio Per Tuba / Scherzzo Alla Polacca (1980)
 Bogusław Schäffer: Projekt Für Tuba Und Tonband
 Roman W. Zajączek: Tema Cantabile Con Piernicazioni
 Zdzisław Piernik: Dialogue Für Tuba Und Tonband

More important discography
 Zdzisław Piernik – Tuba (LP) Polskie Nagrania SX 1210, 1975
 Zdzisław Piernik – Piernik plays Sikora, Schäffer, Borkowski, Zajaczek, Piernik (LP) Intersound / ProViva ISPV 102, 1980
 Zdzisław Piernik – Tuba (Polish Contemporary Music series) (LP) Polskie Nagrania SX 1806, 1982
 Zdzisław Piernik, Michał Górczyński – Energa One (CD) Kariatyda, 2002
 Zdzisław Piernik, Piotr Zabrodzki – Namanga (CD) Vivo Records, 2008

Notes

References

Bibliography 
 
 
 
 
 
 
 John Griffiths. Zdzisław Piernik Biography in Tuba Euphonium Legends, Windsong Press.

External links 
 Zdzisław Piernik in The National Film Archive Digital Repository (Polish, English)
 Zdzisław Piernik in Polish Film Internet Database (Polish)
 Zdzisław Piernik in Polish Music Information Centre (Polish)
 Zdzisław Piernik in Culture.pl (Polish, English)
 Official page: piernik.art.pl

Tubists
People from Toruń
Polish classical musicians
Polish jazz musicians
Polish music educators
1942 births
Living people
21st-century tubists